In mathematics, Porter's constant C arises in the study of the efficiency of the Euclidean algorithm. It is named after J. W. Porter of University College, Cardiff.

Hans Heilbronn proved that the average number of iterations of Euclid's algorithm, for fixed  and averaged over all choices of relatively prime integers ,
is

Porter showed that the error term in this estimate is a constant, plus a polynomially-small correction, and Donald Knuth evaluated this constant to high accuracy. It is:

 
where
 is the Euler–Mascheroni constant
 is the Riemann zeta function 
 is the Glaisher–Kinkelin constant

See also
Lochs' theorem
Lévy's constant

References

Mathematical constants
Analytic number theory